A41 is the fifth studio album by All-4-One. It was released on March 26, 2002, and marks their first independent release. It features the singles "Not Ready 4 Goodbye" and the top 20 Adult Contemporary hit "Beautiful as U".

Track listing
 "Green Light"
 "Not Ready 4 Goodbye"
 "Heaven Sent"
 "Friday Night"
 "I Just Wanna Be Your Everything"
 "Beautiful as U"
 "Open Up Your Eyes"
 "I Am Blessed"
 "Before U, Without U, After U"
 "Round & Round"
 "Between Us"

References

2002 albums
All-4-One albums